Boetius Egan (died 1650) was an Irish clergyman who served as the Roman Catholic Bishop of Elphin from 1625 to 1650.

A Franciscan friar, Egan was appointed the bishop of the Diocese of Elphin by the Holy See on 9 June 1625 and consecrated the following year. After serving the see for nearly twenty-five years, he died in office on 19 April 1650.

See also

 Egan (surname)
 Mac Aodhagáin

References 

 
 
 
 
 

Year of birth unknown
1650 deaths
17th-century Roman Catholic bishops in Ireland
Roman Catholic bishops of Elphin